Fur is a hamlet in Karlskrona Municipality, Blekinge County, southeastern Sweden.

Populated places in Karlskrona Municipality